Three Bluejackets and a Blonde (German: Drei blaue Jungs, ein blondes Mädel) is a 1933 German comedy film directed by Carl Boese and starring Charlotte Ander, Heinz Rühmann and Friedrich Benfer. It was shot at the Babelsberg Studios in Berlin. The film's sets were designed by the art director Karl Machus.

Cast
Charlotte Ander as Ilse Schröder 
Heinz Rühmann as Cadet Heini Jäger  
Friedrich Benfer as Willy Thiem  
Fritz Kampers as Heini's Butenschön
Hans Richter as Fritz, Ilse's brother 
Sophie Pagay as Heini's mother
Gerhard Dammann
Karl Hannemann
Hans Hemes
Hans Albin
Adolf Fischer
Karl Klöckner

References

Bibliography 
 Klaus, Ulrich J. Deutsche Tonfilme: Jahrgang 1933. Klaus-Archiv, 1988.

External links

1933 comedy films
German comedy films
Films of Nazi Germany
Films directed by Carl Boese
Military humor in film
Seafaring films
Films set in the Baltic Sea
German black-and-white films
Films scored by Eduard Künneke
Films shot at Babelsberg Studios
1930s German films